Civic Center is an elevated metro station in Atlanta, Georgia, serving the Red and Gold lines of the Metropolitan Atlanta Rapid Transit Authority (MARTA) rail system. It is located in Atlanta's SoNo district. This station has seen an increase of faregate totals and ridership in the past years due to the Megabus, which drops off and picks up passengers above the station. Additionally, there has been an increased interest in high-rise buildings in the area.

Location

Civic Center station is located in SoNo, a sub-district of Downtown, with convenient access to the southern end of Midtown Atlanta. The station is named after the now-closed Atlanta Civic Center three blocks east at Piedmont Avenue NE, Centennial Hill, Emory University Hospital Midtown, Peachtree Summit and SunTrust Plaza skyscrapers to the south. Nearby tourist attractions are Centennial Olympic Park, National Center for Civil and Human Rights, The World of Coca-Cola, and The Georgia Aquarium.

Station layout

Civic Center has a unique layout compared to other stations of the MARTA system. Although the rest of the line in Downtown and Midtown is underground, the station is actually elevated, except for the extreme ends of the platforms, where the line once more becomes underground. This is because it lies perpendicular to and above the trench for the Downtown Connector (I-75/85). This station is among a very small number of subway stations in the world that are simultaneously above a highway and below street level, similar to the 174th–175th Streets station in The Bronx.

Connection to other transit systems
CobbLinc
Ride Gwinnett
Georgia Regional Transportation Authority
Megabus

Nearby Attractions
World of Coca-Cola
National Center for Civil and Human Rights
Georgia Aquarium
Pemberton Place
Centennial Olympic Park

References

External links

MARTA station page
nycsubway.org Atlanta page
 Peachtree Street entrance from Google Map Street View

Gold Line (MARTA)
Red Line (MARTA)
Metropolitan Atlanta Rapid Transit Authority stations
Railway stations in the United States opened in 1981
Railway stations in Atlanta
1981 establishments in Georgia (U.S. state)